Wojciech Jarmuż (born 5 January 1984 in Słupsk) is a Polish footballer (defender) who last played for Polish Ekstraklasa side GKS Bełchatów.

External links
 Career history at 90minut.pl

1984 births
Living people
Sportspeople from Słupsk
Widzew Łódź players
Polish footballers
Association football defenders